The 2022–23 Servette FC season is the club's 133rd season in existence and the fourth consecutive season in the top flight of Swiss football. In addition to the domestic league, Servette will participate in this season's edition of the Swiss Cup. The season covers the period from 1 July 2022 to 30 June 2023.

Players

First-team squad

Out on loan

Transfers

In

Out

Pre-season and friendlies

Competitions

Overview

Swiss Super League

League table

Results summary

Results by round

Matches

Swiss Cup

Statistics

Goalscorers

References

Servette FC seasons
Servette